Hoe or HOE may refer to:

 Hoe (food), a Korean dish of raw fish
 Hoe (letter), a Georgian letter
 Hoe (tool), a hand tool used in gardening and farming
 Hoe-farming, a term for primitive forms of agriculture
 Backhoe, a piece of excavating equipment
 HOE, pharmaceutical compound number prefix for Hoechst AG

People 
 James Hoe, American academic
 Richard March Hoe (1812–1886), American inventor
 Robert Hoe (1784–1833), English-born American businessman, the father of Richard Hoe
 Robert Hoe III (1839–1909), American businessman, the grandson of Robert Hoe

Places 
 Ban Huoeisay Airport, in Laos
 Hoe, Norfolk, a village in Norfolk, England, United Kingdom
 Homerville Airport, in Georgia, United States
 Plymouth Hoe, a public space in Plymouth, England, United Kingdom

Media 
 Heroes Over Europe, a video game
 "Hoe", a 2014 song by Kirko Bangz
 "H.O.E. (Heaven on Earth)", a song by Yo Gotti from the 2020 album Untrapped
 "Happiness Over Everything (H.O.E.), a song by Jhené Aiko the 2020 album Chilombo

Other uses 
 H0e scale, in model railroading
 Holographic optical element
 Horom language, spoken in Nigeria
 R. Hoe & Company, a manufacturer of printing presses
 USS Hoe (SS-258), a U.S. Navy submarine from World War II
 Homing Overlay Experiment, a project in the Strategic Defense Initiative
 Hoe (occupation), someone engaging in prostitution
 Hoes (surname)

See also 
 Ho (disambiguation)